Matthew Dickie (19 August 1873 – 30 December 1959) was a Scottish professional footballer who played as a goalkeeper and is best known for his time with Rangers. He also played for Renton and Clyde.

Dickie made his Rangers debut against St Mirren in a 5–1 home win at Ibrox on 15 August 1896. He played 126 league matches from a possible 132 during one sequence and went on to make 175 first class appearances over his eight years at the club, and 275 in total.

Dickie won four Scottish Football League championships, three Scottish Cups, five Glasgow Cups and two Charity Cups with Rangers, and represented Scotland three times.

References

Sources

1873 births
1959 deaths
Rangers F.C. players
Clyde F.C. players
Scotland international footballers
Scottish footballers
Association football goalkeepers
Renton F.C. players
Scottish Football League players
Scottish Football League representative players
People from Rhu, Argyll and Bute
Sportspeople from Argyll and Bute